Eulogio Sánchez Airport , also known as Tobalaba Airport, is an airport in La Reina, an eastern suburb of Santiago, Chile. It is two-thirds owned by the Club Aéreo de Santiago and one-third owned by the Club Aéreo de Carabineros de Chile. Also, it holds the headquarters of Airbus Helicopters Chile S.A.

The airport consists of 120 acres on the eastern edge of the Santiago metropolitan area. It was constructed in 1954 and named for the then-president of the Club Aéreo de Santiago, Eulogio Sánchez Errazuriz (1903-1956). Its taxiways, runway and fuel platform are the only public use infrastructure areas at the airport. It is home to about 100 aircraft, a restaurant and a public park next to the main entrance in Alcalde Fernando Castillo Velasco Avenue.

Runway 19 has an additional  displaced threshold.

Operations 
Eulogio Sánchez Airport is home to Club Aéreo de Santiago, Club Aéreo de Carabineros, Airbus Helicopters Chile S.A. and more, while organisms such as PDI (Policía de Investigaciones), Ecocopter, RomeoMike, Aeromet and SumaAir see a lot of operations in and out of Tobalaba.

See also

Transport in Chile
List of airports in Chile

References

External links
DGAC IFIS 
OpenStreetMap - Eulogio Sánchez Airport
SkyVector - Eulogio Sánchez Airport

Transport in Santiago
Airports in Santiago Metropolitan Region